Ylistaro is a former municipality of Finland. It was consolidated, together with Nurmo to Seinäjoki on 1 January 2009.

It is located in the province of Western Finland and is part of the Southern Ostrobothnia region. The municipality had a population of 5,582 (2003) and covered an area of 484.08 km² of which 2.73 km² is water. The population density was 11.6 inhabitants per km².

The municipality was unilingually Finnish.

In May 2007 it was agreed that Ylistaro would merge with the city of Seinäjoki and the neighbouring municipality of Nurmo; so from 2009 Ylistaro ended its independent existence.

External links 

Populated places disestablished in 2009
2009 disestablishments in Finland
Former municipalities of Finland
Seinäjoki